James "Jimmy" Dobson (October 2, 1920 – December 6, 1987) was an American actor. He appeared in numerous Broadway, film and television roles. Metacritic stated that Dobson was a “supporting actor; he often played military men and appeared in many Westerns.” He is best-known as Lieutenant Pudge McCabe in the John Wayne film Flying Leathernecks. He was the dialogue director for the McMillan and Wife television series and also played various roles in a few of the episodes. He was Steward Anderson in The Love Boat TV series.

Early life and education 
The oldest child of Leta (nee McAmis) and Benjamin Dobson, James "Jimmy" Dobson was born in Greeneville, Tennessee on October 2, 1920. Dobson's father was a longtime postal employee for the city of Greenville. James had a younger brother named John Dobson, who is also deceased. John was a librarian at the University of Tennessee.

The Greeneville Sun stated that Dobson "played ball, loved to swim and loved to ride his bike." At an early age, Dobson realized that he had an innate ability to entertain people. He was an active participant in the Greeneville High School drama club. After graduation, he enrolled at Tusculum College, now known as Tusculum University. Dobson was in the college drama club. He was also in the drama club while attending the University of Tennessee. There, he won a trip to Hollywood. The Associated Press stated that "Dobson decided to become an actor after visiting Hollywood."

Career 
Before moving to Hollywood, Dobson first moved to New York City. There, he worked as a stage actor for Life with Father, The Wind is 90, The Firebrand of Florence, and Mr. Adam. He was also a voice actor for radio shows, most notable was Archie Andrews. He, along with Cy Walter and Richard Kollmar, wrote a song together, I'll Never Tire of You. It was recorded in New York City on November 12, 1941, by the Sam Donahue Orchestra as a RCA Victor - Bluebird 78 rpm single. (Interesting to note: Dobson and Kollmar both attended Tusculum College, suggesting a possible connection as to why they worked together, and with Walter, to write I'll Never Tire of You.) Dobson eventually moved to Hollywood after living in New York for a few years. During his long-lived career, he appeared in numerous film and television productions. John Wayne was fond of Dobson. They worked in a few films together. Dobson appeared with President Reagan and his wife Nancy in Hellcats of the Navy. Even though Dobson was a fine actor and well liked by many in the entertainment industry, he never did rise to the level of stardom.

Personal life 
Dobson lived in California during his acting career, but did occasionally return to his hometown of Greeneville to visit family and friends. The Greeneville Sun stated that "he liked to stroll along Main and Depot streets, meeting and talking to people. He also liked to bring friends along to visit the hills of East Tennessee." Actress, dancer Ann Miller, who dated Howard Hughes, Conrad Hilton, and Louis B. Mayer, was one of those friends. Dobson and her were in a relationship for a while. She often accompanied him when he visited Greenville. During one of the visits, the two of them went to a public pool that was located in Greenville. Dobson and Miller both wore risqué swimsuits there, which  prompted the management to summon local law enforcement to have them peaceably removed from the premises.

Death 
Dobson died of a heart attack on Sunday, December 6, 1987, at the age of 67. He was cremated. The Greeneville Sun stated that "his ashes were scattered in the beloved surf below his seaside home."

Filmography

References

External links
 

1920 births
1987 deaths
American film actors
American television actors
American voice actors
People from Greeneville, Tennessee
Tusculum, Tennessee
20th-century American actors
People from Greene County, Tennessee
Male actors from Tennessee